Events in the year 1930 in Norway.

Incumbents
Monarch – Haakon VII

Events
 12 November – Norway relinquishes its claim to the Sverdrup Islands.
 Having established two years earlier, what is to become Norway's largest industrial park at Herøya outside Porsgrunn, Norsk Hydro opens up its first plant in this location.
 The 1930 Parliamentary election takes place.

Popular culture

Sports

Music

Film

Literature
 The Knut Hamsund novel August Volume 1 & 2, was published.

Notable births
 
 
9 January – Tone Groven Holmboe, composer and teacher
12 January – Per Andersen, neuroscientist
12 January – Viking Mestad, banker and politician
6 February – Rikard Olsvik, politician
30 March – Petter Fauchald, footballer (died 2013)
8 April – Kåre Lunden, historian
28 April – Paul Hilmar Jenson, philatelist (died 2004)
6 May – Kjell Bækkelund, pianist (died 2004)
10 May – Jens Bugge, judge
29 May – Liv Stubberud, politician (died 1997)
21 June – Arnor Njøs, soil researcher
21 June – Trygve Reenskaug, computer scientist
23 June – Annasif Døhlen, sculptor (died 2021).
4 July – Thea Knutzen, politician
9 July – Elsa Lystad, actress.
9 July – Håkon Randal, politician
7 August – Gunnar Ellefsen, politician (died 1997)
10 August – Axel Buch, politician (died 1998)
11 August – Arne Vinje Gunnerud, sculptor (died 2007).
27 August – Aase Foss Abrahamsen, children's writer.
7 September – Olav Sigurd Carlsen, politician
12 September – Gunder Gundersen, Nordic combined skier and sports official (died 2005)
16 October – Hans Andreas Ihlebæk, journalist (died 1993)
19 October – Vesla Vetlesen, politician and Minister
24 October – Johan Galtung, sociologist
30 October – Sjur Hopperstad, politician
20 November – Kjell Storvik, economist and former Governor of the Central Bank of Norway
24 November – Tor Halvorsen, trade unionist, politician and Minister (died 1987)
18 December – Tor Hagfors, scientist, radio astronomer and radar expert (died 2007)
19 December – Knut Helle, historian and professor (died 2015).
20 December – Jan Elgarøy, organist and composer
22 December – Per Bredesen, international soccer player (died 2022)
30 December – Sigfrid Mohn, politician

Notable deaths

7 January – Jacob Breda Bull, author (born 1853)
10 February – Mons Monssen, sailor in the United States Navy who received the Medal of Honor (born 1867)
12 February – Oddmund Vik, politician (born 1858)
24 February – Christian Theodor Holtfodt, politician (born 1863)
14 April – Sigurd Ibsen, author and politician (born 1859)
13 May – Fridtjof Nansen, explorer, scientist and diplomat, awarded the Nobel Peace Prize in 1922 (born 1861)
5 October – Haaken L. Mathiesen, landowner and businessperson (born 1858)
14 October – Wilhelm Christian Magelssen, politician and Minister (born 1867)
26 November – Otto Sverdrup, Arctic scientist and explorer (born 1854)
9 December – Lauritz Christiansen, sailor and Olympic gold medallist (born 1867)
29 December – Oscar Borg, composer (born 1851)

Full date unknown
Kristofer Kristofersson Hjeltnes, horticulturist and politician (born 1856)

See also

References

External links